There have been two baronetcies held by people with the surname Lamb, both in the Baronetage of Great Britain. Both creations are extinct.

The Lamb Baronetcy, of Brocket Hall in the County of Hertford, was created in the Baronetage of Great Britain on 17 January 1755. For more information on this creation, see Viscount Melbourne.

The Burges, later Lamb Baronetcy, of Burghfield in the County of Berkshire, was created in the Baronetage of Great Britain on 21 October 1795 for the poet and politician James Burges. He married as his first wife Elizabeth Noel, daughter of Edward Noel, 1st Viscount Wentworth and Judith Lamb, daughter of William Lamb. In 1821 he assumed by Royal licence the surname of Lamb in lieu of his patronymic. He was succeeded by his son by his second wife Anne Montolieu, Charles, the second Baronet. He was Knight Marshal of the Royal Household between 1824 and 1864. The title became extinct on the death of the fourth Baronet in 1948.

Lamb baronets, of Brocket Hall (1755)
see Viscount Melbourne

Burges, later Lamb baronets, of Burghfield (1795)
The Burges family settled near Reading during the reign of Henry VIII; the surname is claimed to derive from Bruges in Flanders. Colonel Roger Burges held the town of Faringdon for the king during the English Civil War (1642–1651) and was later captured at the Battle of Naseby. After his release he became commander of Castle Cornet, the last Royalist garrison to surrender to Cromwell after the 1651 Battle of Worcester. He was eventually succeeded by George Burges (1723–1786) who was military secretary and aide-de-camp to Major General Humphrey Bland. At the 1746 Battle of Culloden, Burges captured the standard of Charles Edward Stuart. He later became receiver-general of the salt duties and comptroller the customs of Scotland. By his 1748 marriage to Anne Wichnour, daughter of James Somerville, 13th Lord Somerville, he was the father of the first baronet, James Burges, who legally changed his name to James Bland Lamb by Royal Licence in 1821.

Sir James Bland Lamb, 1st Baronet (1752–1824)
Sir Charles Montolieu Lamb, 2nd Baronet (1785–1864)
Charles James Savile Montgomerie Lamb (–1856)
Sir Archibald Lamb, 3rd Baronet (1845–1921)
Sir Charles Anthony Lamb, 4th Baronet (1857–1948)

References

Extinct baronetcies in the Baronetage of Great Britain
1755 establishments in Great Britain